The 13th Alberta Legislative Assembly was in session from August 17, 1955, to May 9, 1959, with the membership of the assembly determined by the results of the 1955 Alberta general election held on June 29, 1955. The Legislature officially resumed on August 17, 1955, and continued until the fifth session was prorogued on April 7, 1959, and dissolved on May 9, 1959, prior to the 1959 Alberta general election.

Alberta's thirteenth government was controlled by the majority Social Credit Party for the sixth time, led by Premier Ernest Manning who would go on to be the longest serving Premier in Alberta history. The Official Opposition was led by James Harper Prowse a member of the Alberta Liberal Party until the fifth session when Grant MacEwan became the leader of the Official Opposition. The Speaker was Peter Dawson who would serve until his death during the 15th legislature on March 24, 1963.

Standings changes since the 13th general election

The candidate in Okotoks-High River was jointly nominated by the Progressive Conservative and Liberal parties.

References

Further reading

External links
Alberta Legislative Assembly
Legislative Assembly of Alberta Members Book
By-elections 1905 to present

12